Wildwood Preserve Metropark is a nature reserve and historic estate located in Sylvania Township, Ohio. Wildwood is the most-visited of the 19-park Metroparks Toledo district.

Metroparks Toledo purchased the property in 1975 following a citizen-led effort to preserve the grounds of Stranleigh Estate. The Georgian colonial style house and surrounding buildings comprised the family residence of Champion spark plug magnate Robert A. Stranahan, Sr., his wife Paige, and their children, including professional golfer Frank Stranahan.

Wildwood features one of the last remaining public, free-admission gardens designed by Ellen Biddle Shipman. The park also features the former Oak Grove School, a one-room schoolhouse built by the Sylvania Board of Education in 1897.

Wildwood Manor House

Built in 1938, the Wildwood Manor House was the home of the original owners. The house, still decorated in a Georgian colonial style, is now partially open to the public for free tours, while other buildings on the property are now used as public restrooms, visitors centers, and offices.

References

External links
Wildwood Preserve Metropark - Metroparks Toledo
Wildwood Manor House
Park Map

Protected areas of Lucas County, Ohio
Parks in Ohio
Historic house museums in Ohio
Museums in Toledo, Ohio
Metroparks Toledo